George Courtenay may refer to:

George Courtenay (politician) (1666–1725), English MP
George Courtenay (actor), actor in the 1913 film Ivanhoe
Sir George Courtenay, 1st Baronet (c. 1583–1644), Irish landowner and soldier

See also
George Courtney (born 1941), English football referee
Courtenay (surname)